Mayank Jitender Dagar  (born 11 November 1996) is a domestic cricketer who plays for Himachal Pradesh in domestic cricket. He is a right-handed batsman and slow left-arm orthodox bowler. He was part of India's squad for 2016 Under-19 Cricket World Cup. He made his first-class debut for Himachal Pradesh in the 2016–17 Ranji Trophy on 6 October 2016. In January 2018, he was bought by the Kings XI Punjab in the 2018 IPL auction. In July 2018, uncapped player Mayank Dagar scored 19.3 in yo-yo test, beating the record of Manish Pandey who had a top score of 19.2 achieved in 2017.

Personal life
Born in Delhi, Dagar attended the Bishop Cotton School in Shimla, which is one of the oldest boarding schools in Asia. His father Jitender Dagar, who played cricket at the university level, works as a contractor for Municipal Corporation of Delhi. Former Indian cricketer Virender Sehwag is a cousin of Dagar's mother.

See also 

 Vijay Zol
 Yogesh Takawale
 Hiten Dalal

References

External links
 
 

1996 births
Living people
Indian cricketers
Himachal Pradesh cricketers

Punjab Kings cricketers